Strigillaria is a genus of gastropods belonging to subfamily Clausiliinae of the family Clausiliidae.

Species
 Strigillaria bulgariensis (L. Pfeiffer, 1848)
 Strigillaria cana (Held, 1836)
 Strigillaria denticulata (Olivier, 1801)
 Strigillaria fraudigera (Rossmässler, 1839)
 Strigillaria fritillaria (Frivaldsky, 1835)
 Strigillaria hemmenorum (H. Nordsieck, 2015)
 Strigillaria hiltrudae (H. Nordsieck, 1974)
 Strigillaria iniucunda (R. A. Brandt, 1962)
 Strigillaria pindica (H. Nordsieck, 1974)
 Strigillaria pseudofraudigera (H. Nordsieck, 1973)
 Strigillaria rugicollis (Rossmässler, 1836)
 Strigillaria serbica (Möllendorff, 1873)
 Strigillaria stolii (L. Pfeiffer, 1859)
 Strigillaria thessalonica (Rossmässler, 1839)
 Strigillaria urbanskii (H. Nordsieck, 1973)
 Strigillaria varnensis (L. Pfeiffer, 1848)
 Strigillaria vetusta (Rossmässler, 1836)
Synonyms
 Strigillaria erberi (Frauenfeld, 1867): synonym of Strigillaria denticulata erberi (Frauenfeld, 1867) (superseded taxonomic position)
 Strigillaria moellendorffi (H. Nordsieck, 1972): synonym of Strigillaria serbica (Möllendorff, 1873) (invalid; unnecessary replacement name)
 Strigillaria mystica (Westerlund, 1893): synonym of Strigillaria thessalonica mystica (Westerlund, 1893) (superseded taxonomic position)

References

Avec Atlas, vol. 1, p. xii pp. + Évaluation (1 pp.) + 432 pp. + Errata (1 pp.); Atlas, 1st livraison: vii pp., pls 1-17
 Lindholm, W. A. (1924). A revised systematic list of the genera of the Clausiliidae, recent and fossil, with their subdivisions, synonymy, and types. Proceedings of the Malacological Society of London. 16 (1): 53‑6
 Nordsieck, H. (2019). New and Unknown Species Taxa of Western Palaearctic Clausiliidae (Gastropoda, Stylommatophora). Conchylia. 50 (1-4): 91-115
 Bank, R. A. (2017). Classification of the Recent terrestrial Gastropoda of the World. Last update: July 16th, 2017

External links
 

Clausiliidae